The Leases by Corporations Act 1541 (33 Hen 8 c 27) was an Act of the Parliament of England.  The whole Act was repealed by section 39(1) of, and Schedule 5 to, the Charities Act 1960.

The Act provided "that any powers belonging to a corporation can be
exercised by a majority of the corporators, notwithstanding any directions to
the contrary in their foundation statutes."

References
Halsbury's Statutes,

Acts of the Parliament of England (1485–1603)
1541 in law
1541 in England